Construction-Destruction (C-D) is a 2003 construction simulation game for Windows, developed by Gabriel Entertainment and published by ValuSoft.

Construction-Destruction features various construction vehicles (which act as the player character) that can move various objects, including dirt, via the physics engine, Havok. The vehicles each have separate controllable features like the arm, bed, bucket, ball, fork, hook, and cab rotation.

Vehicles
 Bulldozer
 Crane
 Dump truck
 Excavator
 Front-end loader

Levels
Levels are various construction sites like empty lots, a quarry, a street, etc.

External links
 ValuSoft's 
 Game's press release on Gabriel Entertainment
 
 Construction-Destruction feature list

2003 video games
Construction and management simulation games
Video games developed in the United States
Windows games
Windows-only games
Gabriel Entertainment games